Lower South River (Scottish Gaelic: Bun na h-Aibhne) is a community in the Canadian province of Nova Scotia, located  in Antigonish County.

Residents of note
 Garfield MacDonald, silver medalist at 1908 Olympics

References

Further reading

Communities in Antigonish County, Nova Scotia
General Service Areas in Nova Scotia